National Competition Policy is formulated by the Government of India with a view to achieve highest sustainable levels of economic growth, entrepreneurship, employment, higher standards of living for citizens, protect economic rights for just, equitable, inclusive and sustainable economic and social development, promote economic democracy and support good governance by restricting rent-seeking practices. Dhanendra Kumar was the Chairman of the committee which was entrusted the task of formulating India's National Competition Policy.

Objectives
The policy is aimed at ushering in a second wave of financial reforms.  The salient features of the policy are stated below:
 To guarantee consumer welfare by encouraging optimal allocation of resources and granting economic agents appropriate incentives to pursue productive efficiency, quality and innovation
 To remove anti-competition outcome of existing acts, harmonize laws and policies of Centre and State and proactively promote competition principles
 Strive for single national market.
 Establish a level playing field by providing ''competitive neutrality'.

See also
 Competition Commission of India
 The Competition Act, 2002
 Dhanendra Kumar

References

External links
 Draft National Competition Policy 2011

Policies of India
Ministry of Commerce and Industry (India)
Economic policy in Asia
Competition (economics)